Shravaneri is a village in Hassan district of Karnataka state, India.

Location
The village lies between Channarayapatna and Shravanabelagola.

Education
Government Higher Primary School, has grades up to 8th.

Demographics
There are 840 people in Shravaneri living in 220 houses.

Postal code
There is a post office in Shravaneri and the postal code is 573135.

See also
 B.Cholenahalli
 Kantharajapura

References

Villages in Hassan district